Gymnobela turrispira is a species of sea snail, a marine gastropod mollusk in the family Raphitomidae.

Description

Distribution
This marine species was found in the Naska y Sala-i-Gomes Ridges, East Pacific

References

 Sysoev, A. V. "Gastropods of the fam. Turridae (Gastropoda: Toxoglossa) from the underwater Sala y Gomez Ridge." Transactions of the PP Shirshov Institute of Oceanology [Trudy Instituta Okeanologii] 124 (1990): 245-260.

External links
 
 Census of Marine Life (2012). SYNDEEP: Towards a first global synthesis of biodiversity, biogeography and ecosystem function in the deep sea. Unpublished data 

turrispira
Gastropods described in 1990